The IBM 3196 Display Station is a 24x80 monochrome display and keyboard made by IBM. It can be used with the System/36, System/38, or AS/400 through wired attachment or Telnet. It uses a typewriter keyboard to enter, display, and manipulate data on a 12-inch monochrome screen. The 3196 performs all the basic functions of the 5291-2, as well as some additional functions. The 3196 also has a 25th character line line containing an operator information area. The 3196 is compatible with the 5291 Model 2 Display Station and applications written for that product will operate on the 3196.

Features
 24x80 monochrome display
 Offers functions equivalent to the 5291 model 2
 Comes with Cable-Thru with Auto-Termination and Screen Glare Reduction
 Consists of three workstation elements: video, logic, and keyboard
 Offers field editing of individual data-input fields
 Allows variety of cable attachments and connections
 Provides Security Keylock and other security facilities

Elements 
The IBM 3196 contains the following elements:

 Display
 Display stand
 122-key keyboard
 Keyboard overlay
 Logic element
 Auto-termination unit
 Security keys
 Video cable
 Power cord
 User guide

References 

3196
3196